Hushang Hamidi (born in Iran) is an Iranian Kurdish politician.

He was the representative of Sanandaj in the 7th legislature of the Iranian parliament.

See also
 Majlis of Iran

References

Iranian Kurdish politicians
Living people
Year of birth missing (living people)
Members of the 7th Islamic Consultative Assembly
People from Sanandaj